A Crooked Game is a 1930 drama horse racing novel by Australian author Arthur Wright. It was the last of his novels published in his lifetime.

References

External links
A Crooked Game at AustLit

1930 Australian novels
Australian sports novels
Horse racing novels